Chococtenus is a genus of spiders in the family Ctenidae. It was first described in 2015 by Dupérré. , it contains 15 species, all from South America.

Species

Chococtenus comprises the following species:
Chococtenus acanthoctenoides (Schmidt, 1956)
Chococtenus cappuccino Dupérré, 2015
Chococtenus cuchilla Dupérré, 2015
Chococtenus duendecito Dupérré, 2015
Chococtenus fantasma Dupérré, 2015
Chococtenus kashakara Dupérré, 2015
Chococtenus lasdamas Dupérré, 2015
Chococtenus luchoi Dupérré, 2015
Chococtenus miserabilis (Strand, 1916)
Chococtenus neblina Dupérré, 2015
Chococtenus otonga Dupérré, 2015
Chococtenus otongachi Dupérré, 2015
Chococtenus piemontana Dupérré, 2015
Chococtenus suffuscus Dupérré, 2015
Chococtenus waitti Dupérré, 2015

References

Ctenidae
Araneomorphae genera
Spiders of South America